Arthur D. Reid (born October 17, 1947) was a Canadian politician. He represented the electoral district of Carbonear and Carbonear-Harbour Grace in the Newfoundland and Labrador House of Assembly from 1989 to 1998. He was a member of the Liberal Party of Newfoundland and Labrador. He was born at Carbonear.

References

1947 births
Living people
Liberal Party of Newfoundland and Labrador MHAs